Alex in Wonderland was a 1959 television series of at least thirteen episodes that was distributed by the NTA Film Network. The raconteur Alexander King was the host, giving commentary on various topics.  It was produced by Mitchell Grayson and directed by Max Miller. It was filmed on Tuesdays at NTA's flagship station WNTA-TV beginning on March 10.

References

1959 American television series debuts
1959 American television series endings
1950s American television series
English-language television shows
First-run syndicated television programs in the United States
NTA Film Network